Kenneth Freeman Raymond Chapman (born 16 November 1948) is an English former footballer who played as a winger.

References

1948 births
Living people
Footballers from Grimsby
English footballers
Association football wingers
Louth United F.C. players
Grimsby Town F.C. players
English Football League players